Clinton is a city in and the county seat of Clinton County, Iowa, United States. The population was 24,469 as of 2020. Clinton, along with DeWitt (also located in Clinton County), was named in honor of the sixth governor of New York, DeWitt Clinton. Clinton is the principal city of the Clinton Micropolitan Statistical Area, which is coterminous with Clinton County. Clinton was incorporated on January 26, 1857.

History

Among the first settlers of European origin in the Clinton area was Elijah Buell, who built a log cabin on July 25, 1835, and in 1837, established the town of Lyons, named after the French city of the same name.  Buell partnered with a John Baker in a successful ferry service across the Mississippi River, at a location called "the Narrows," between Lyons and what would become the city of Fulton, Illinois.  Although Lyons grew rapidly and prospered, it eventually merged into the city of Clinton.

Clinton was platted as the town of New York in 1836 by Joseph Bartlett. Bartlett believed that the region was rich with gold deposits, and he prepared for a boom town to develop.  While waiting for the "gold boom" to materialize, Bartlett started a second ferry service across the Mississippi to the village of Albany, Illinois.  However, his service was not as popular as Buell's in Lyons.  Bartlett soon became discouraged, and sold his assets. In March 1837, Noble and Sarah Gregory Perrin purchased  of land in what is now Clinton and raised their family in a cabin located approximately at the foot of the railroad bridge. Eve Their oldest daughter, Valeria, married Dr. Augustus Lafayette Ankeny, who participated in the Blackhawk war and came to Lyons in April 1850.

Mary Perrin, born September 26, 1837, was the first female child of European ancestry born in Clinton County.  In 1839, as in most early river towns, the town consisted of a sprinkling of cabins, two stores and a tavern.  In 1855, the Chicago, Iowa, Nebraska Railroad announced it would cross the river at Little Rock Island adjacent to Bartlett's settlement.  The Iowa Land Company was organized on May 26, 1855, and on July 4, bought Bartlett's tract and renamed it Clinton, in honor of DeWitt Clinton, two-time governor of New York and one of the driving forces behind the construction of the Erie Canal.

In 1840, the County of Clinton was officially organized; the village of Camanche, just downstream from Bartlett's "New York," became the first county seat.  The settlement that would become Clinton did not change much in the 1840s, but Lyons continued to grow and prosper.  By 1852, stagecoach lines ran from Lyons to Davenport,  to the Southwest; to Iowa City,  to the West; and to Dubuque,  to the Northwest.  That same year, the Lyons and Iowa Central Railroad Company was formed, led by an H.P. Adams.  Work began on the railroad almost immediately, and progressed rapidly.  However, the funds raised to construct the line were insufficient; some were misused.  The venture eventually failed.  The railroad was disparagingly known as "the Calico Line," after the large amount of calico fabric sold at the company store in Lyons.  But the prospect of a railroad to Lyons, and a likely crossing of the Mississippi at the Narrows that would follow, sparked rapid growth in the community.  Lyons' population grew from a mere 200 in 1852, to over 5,000 by 1858.

On November 10, 1855, the first plat of the city of Clinton was signed; the plat was surveyed under the direction of Charles B. Stuart, a civil engineer from New York, with the assistance of William Rumble, engineer, and C.I. Loring, draftsman.  On January 26, 1857 the city was granted a charter and on March 7, the charter was adopted.  On April 5, 1859, the amended charter of the city was adopted, which lasted until a general charter was adopted in 1867.

An announcement came in 1855 that a railroad was to cross the Mississippi, South of Lyons, at Little Rock Island.  At the same time, the Iowa Land Company (ILC) was formed.  The ILC purchased Bartlett's tract on the Iowa shore opposite Little Rock Island. Concurrently, the Chicago, Iowa, & Nebraska (C&IN) Railroad was formed, with the express intent of crossing the Mississippi River at Clinton. Construction on the railroad bridge began in 1856, and Clinton's population grew to over 1,000 as construction continued.  In June 1859, the railroad line was completed to Cedar Rapids. The first train crossed from the Illinois shore to Little Rock Island at noon, January 9, 1860, and was ferried from there to the Iowa shore.  In January 1864, construction was started on the span from Little Rock Island to the Iowa shore and was completed on January 6, 1865. The original single track railroad bridge was replaced by a double track bridge that was completed in 1909.

Also in 1864, the C&IN Railroad merged with the Galena & Chicago Union Railroad to form the Chicago & North Western Railroad (C&NW).  In the north–south direction, railroad development continued as well.  In 1868, the C&NW built a branch line connecting Lyons with the east–west railroad at Clinton.  In 1870, the Iowa Midland Company built a railroad from Lyons to Anamosa, Iowa,  to the Northwest.  This railroad was later absorbed by the C&NW.  In 1872, the Chicago, Clinton, & Dubuque Railroad (CC&D) was built North from Lyons.  It became part of the Milwaukee Road; it extended another line South to Clinton.  The last of the railroads in Clinton, the  Davenport, Rock Island, and Northwestern, was completed from the Southwest along the Mississippi River to Clinton in 1901.  An interurban passenger railroad (the Clinton, Davenport, and Muscatine Railway) operated along this trackage as late as 1940.  This right-of-way, along with that of the former CC&D, is currently operated by Canadian National.

In 1869, due to its importance as a major transportation hub, the county seat was moved to Clinton; it has resided there ever since.  The Clinton County Court House, located at 612 North 2nd Street, was designed by G. Stanley Mansfield, Architect, of Freeport, Illinois, and Josiah L. Rice, Supervising Architect, of Clinton.  It was constructed between 1892 and 1897.

The first public school in Clinton was conducted in a log house near the W.J. Young upper mill.  It was erected in the winter of 1855-56 and Isaac Baldwin was its first teacher.  St. Irenaeus School was opened in 1852.

The original Lyons-Fulton Bridge was constructed in 1891 (replaced by the Mark N. Morris Memorial Bridge in 1975), followed by the Clinton High Bridge in 1892 (replaced by the Gateway Bridge in 1956).

Between the 1850s and 1900, the cities of Lyons and Clinton quickly became centers of the lumber industry and were regarded as the "Lumber Capital of the World." Huge log rafts were floated down the river from Wisconsin and Minnesota, cut into lumber at Clinton, then shipped to the growing communities via the river and the railroads.  Companies owned by the W.J. Young, Chancy Lamb, George M. and Charles F. Curtis (Curtis Bros. & Co), David Joyce, Silas W. Gardiner Lyons, and Friedrich Weyerhäuser families soon became among the largest in the nation.  In the 1880s and 1890s Clinton boasted 13 resident millionaires, more millionaires per capita than any other town or city in the nation.

In 1877 the noted pianist Carl Lachmund founded the German Conservatorium of Music in Clinton.

The largest, most elaborate party ever held in Clinton celebrated the debut of Emma Lamb and the twentieth wedding anniversary of her parents, Artemus and Henrietta Sabrina Smith Lamb on October 13, 1885.  Fellow lumber baron F.C. Weyerhauser, his wife and daughter attended together with several hundred guests all attired in formal wear.

In 1895, Lyons officially merged with the City of Clinton.

The era of opulence came to an end by 1900, as the northern forests were depleted.  The sawmills closed, but the railroad and river, providing economical transportation in all directions, attracted manufacturing and heavy industry.  The city still boasts a number of magnificent Victorian mansions, including the Curtis Mansion, now the home of the Clinton Women's Club.

The American Protective Association (APA) was founded in Clinton on March 13, 1887 by Attorney Henry Francis Bowers.

In 1941, with Howard Judd as coach, Clinton High School won the first of its 11 state championships in swimming.  This string included five straight championships between 1954 and 1958 and produced 39 individual All Americans and 14 Individual All American Relay Teams (The Howard Judd Story Reception Program June 5, 1966). Clinton's athletic successes were added to in 1953 when St. Mary's won the state basketball championship.

Other great athletic triumphs were achieved by the 1964 Clinton High School boys’ baseball team winning the State Championship, the 1991 Clinton Giants winning the Midwest League baseball championship and by the 1992 Clinton High School boys’ basketball team (referred to as the '92 Crew) winning the State Championship.

Construction of the Gateway Bridge (Illinois-Iowa) was started in August 1954, was finished in May 1956.  It opened on July 1, 1956.

In 2005, Clinton, along with Coon Rapids, Iowa and Sioux City, was awarded one of the inaugural Iowa Great Places designations.  This award brought to Clinton a $1 million state budget allocation for cultural and landscape improvements along the city's riverfront.

In 2009, the Archer Daniels Midland began construction of a new cogeneration plant to provide for its electrical needs, which burns coal and leftover corn for the energy.  The new cogeneration plant went online in 2010.

Geography
Clinton is located at  (41.846863, -90.207330).

Clinton is on the western shore of the Mississippi River and is the easternmost city in Iowa. The Upper Mississippi River National Wildlife and Fish Refuge passes through Clinton along the river.

Climate

Demographics

2010 census
As of the census of 2010, there were 26,885 people, 11,246 households, and 6,889 families residing in the city. The racial makeup of the city was 91.0% White, 4.3% African American, 0.4% Native American, 0.7% Asian, 1.1% from other races, and 2.5% from two or more races. Hispanic or Latino of any race were 3.3% of the population.

There were 11,246 households, of which 29.5% had children under the age of 18 living with them, 43.0% were married couples living together, 12.7% had a female householder with no husband present, 5.6% had a male householder with no wife present, and 38.7% were non-families. 32.1% of all households were made up of individuals, and 13.7% had someone living alone who was 65 years of age or older. The average household size was 2.33 and the average family size was 2.90.

The median age in the city was 40.4 years. 23.1% of residents were under the age of 18; 9.3% were between the ages of 18 and 24; 22.8% were from 25 to 44; 27.6% were from 45 to 64; and 17.1% were 65 years of age or older. The gender makeup of the city was 48.5% male and 51.5% female.

2000 census
As of the census of 2000, there were 27,772 people, 11,427 households, and 7,358 families residing in the city. The racial makeup of the city was 93.80% White, 3.22% African American, 0.32% Native American, 0.81% Asian, 0.01% Pacific Islander, 0.51% from other races, and 1.34% from two or more races. Hispanic or Latino of any race were 1.68% of the population.

There were 11,427 households, out of which 30.1% had children under the age of 18 living with them, 48.9% were married couples living together, 11.7% had a female householder with no husband present, and 35.6% were non-families. 30.2% of all households were made up of individuals, and 13.0% had someone living alone who was 65 years of age or older. The average household size was 2.36 and the average family size was 2.93.

Age spread: 24.6% under the age of 18, 9.1% from 18 to 24, 26.8% from 25 to 44, 22.5% from 45 to 64, and 17.0% who were 65 years of age or older. The median age was 38 years. For every 100 females, there were 91.3 males. For every 100 females age 18 and over, there were 88.1 males.

In the 2000 census 37.7% of the population reported they were of German ancestry, 15.3% of Irish ancestry, 11.4% of British (English, Scottish, Welsh or Scots-Irish) ancestry, 7.8% of Scandinavian ancestry and 5.8% of Dutch ancestry.

The median income for a household in the city was $34,159, and the median income for a family was $43,157. Males had a median income of $34,210 versus $20,882 for females. The per capita income for the city was $17,320. About 10.0% of families and 12.5% of the population were below the poverty line, including 18.5% of those under age 18 and 7.7% of those age 65 or over.

Parks and recreation

Parks
The most notable parks are Eagle Point Park and Riverview Park.
Other parks are Dewitt Park, Root Park, Southside Park, Edwin P Neubauer Park, River View Stadium, and Four Square Park.
Clinton has the First White Settler in Clinton County Historical Marker.
Tourist attractions
The Bickelhaupt Arboretum is a non-profit arboretum with one of North America's largest collections of dwarf conifers.
Felix Adler Children's Discovery Center a non-profit children's center to explore science, the arts and culture.

Transportation

U.S. Route 30 (Lincoln Highway), U.S. Route 67 (Great River Road), and Iowa Highway 136 pass through Clinton.

For air travel, the Quad City International Airport, which is about 40 miles away in Moline, Illinois, is the closest commercial airport and can be reached in less than one hour by car. Chicago's O'Hare International Airport is about 140 miles east, and can typically be reached in less than three hours by car.

Clinton has a municipal airport (Clinton Municipal Airport, KCWI) that serves the general aviation community. There are two runways, 3-21 which is 5,200' long, and 14-32 which is 3700' long. Numerous instrument approaches are available.

Major railroads include the Union Pacific Railroad and the Canadian Pacific.

A national U.S. recreation trail, the Mississippi River Trail passes through Clinton.

For intracity transit, residents can rely on the MTA's (Municipal Transit Authority) 6 bus routes that run throughout the city. Disabled residents can rely on the MTA's para-transit service.

Education
Clinton Community College is in the community.

Clinton Community School District operates public schools, including Clinton High School.

Clinton Public Library is the local public library system.

Culture and institutions

 Bickelhaupt Arboretum 340 S. 14th St.
 Clinton LumberKings, a collegiate summer baseball team of the Prospect League that plays at NelsonCorp Field. They were previously members of the Class A Midwest League and were affiliated with Major League Baseball teams.
 Clinton Area Showboat Theatre, see Clinton Area Showboat Theatre

Religion

The community has a single Roman Catholic church,  Jesus Christ Prince of Peace Parish, which opened in March 2009, consolidating the membership of five previous churches: Sacred Heart, St. Boniface, St. Irenaeus, St. Mary's, and St. Patrick's. Prince of Peace Catholic Academy and College Preparatory, as of 2011, uses the Sacred Heart property.

Architecture

National Historic Landmark
The Van Allen Building, a National Historic Landmark designed by Louis Sullivan, was completed in 1914

Buildings listed on the National Register of Historic Places:
 Clinton County Courthouse, constructed from 1892 to 1897 by architects Stanley Mansfield and Josiah Rice in Romanesque Revival style.  Exterior walls are of red sandstone and granite and the tower is of copper which has weathered to a bright green color. Noted architect Claire Allen from Jackson, Michigan also worked on this building.
 Clinton Public Library, financed by Andrew Carnegie and built 1903-1904 from the design of the Chicago architectural firm of Patton & Miller. Beaux Arts Neoclassica; style with a monumental entry with processional steps and flanking paired columns. Symmetry of design and borrowings of Greek and Roman inspired elements complete the composition.  Exterior walls of cut and dressed limestone.
 Lafayette Lamb House (YWCA), constructed in 1877 by architect W.W. Sanborn and rebuilt in 1906.  Originally built in the Second Empire style, the 1906 'modernization' converted it to more of the Georgian Revival style.
 City National Bank (First National Bank), designed by John Morrell & Son in the Neoclassical style and constructed in 1911-1912
 Howes Building, constructed in 1900 for Edward Madison Howes by architect Josiah Rice in Renaissance Revival style, featuring engaged pilasters with Ionic capitals.  The exterior street facades of the building are of red face brick with decorative accents of red terracotta.  The fourth floor added in 1905 by architect John Morrell.
 Ankeny Building, constructed in 1930, designed by Chicago architect Harold Holmes in "Moderne" or Art Deco style.  The building street facades are clad with cream-colored terracotta panels.  Upper story windows are steel and glass in a stylized "Chicago window" expression.  The Clinton Herald Monday December 8, 1930 p. 8, The Clinton Herald Saturday December 13, 1930 p. 5, The Clinton Herald Monday December 15, 1930 p. 16, The Clinton Herald Tuesday December 30, 1930 p. 5, The Clinton Herald Tuesday, January 6, 1931 p. 5, The Clinton Herald Thursday, January 8, 1931 p. 5, The Clinton Herald Thursday May 21, 1931 p. 11.
 Moeszinger-Marquis (Armstrong) Building, designed by Josiah Rice and constructed in 1891 by William Bentley for the Clinton Produce Company.  In 1907 the Baldwin Bros. acquired the building for its wholesale hardware business, which in turn passed to its successor company, the Moeszinger-Marquis Hardware Company in 1912.  In 1941 the building was acquired by R.W. Armstrong, who also conducted a wholesale hardware business from the premises.
 George M. Curtis Mansion (Women's Club), constructed in Queen Anne style in 1883-1884
 Castle Terrace Historic District, Originally platted in 1892.  The project was a promotional effort to show developers, architects, and builders the application and products of the Curtis Company.  The architectural design is highly eclectic, with Tudor Gothic the primary style utilized.
 Cherry Bank, Built 1870–1871, the Dr. A.L. Ankeny/Lindmeier/Cottral house is two stories high with walls of red brick with buff-colored brick used for quoins at the corners and for the window arches.  A cornice, hip roof, and widow's walk cap the building
 Saint Irenaeus Church, was designed by W.W. Sanborn and was constructed from 1864 to 1871.  The parish was found in 1852 in Lyons.  It merged with the other four Clinton parishes in 1990 to form Jesus Christ, Prince of Peace Parish.  The parish continued to use the St. Irenaeus Church building until 2008 when a new church was built near the Mill Creek Parkway.

Notable people

 Felix Adler, "King of Clowns," Ringling Brothers Circus
 Matt Bentley, professional wrestler for Total Nonstop Action Wrestling
 Marquis Childs, Pulitzer Prize-winning columnist
 Muriel Frances Dana, child actress who appeared in silent films
Angela Dohrmann, actress, television personality
 Robert Drouet, actor and playwright
 Pat Flanagan, sportscaster for Major League Baseball in Chicago
 Judith Ellen Foster, lecturer, lawyer, temperance leader, early feminist
 Dale Gardner, NASA astronaut
 Artemus Gates, World War I hero, banker, Assistant Secretary of the Navy for Air during World War II
 Salvatore Giunta, Staff Sergeant, U.S. Army, first living recipient of the Medal of Honor since the Vietnam War.
 Col. David Hilmers, former NASA Astronaut
 Robert Bruce Horsfall, artist
 Bernhard M. Jacobsen, Congressman
 William S. Jacobsen, Congressman
 David Johnson, running back, University of Northern Iowa and Arizona Cardinals
 David Joyce, lumber baron, industrialist
 W. H. D. Koerner, artist
 Otto Kraushaar, educator, 6th president of Goucher College
 Chancy Lamb, lumber baron, industrialist
 Cynthia Leonard, suffragist, writer, mother of Lillian Russell, lived in Clinton
 Raymond J. Lynch, attorney, administrative law judge
 Larry Mac Duff, football player, head coach, and defensive coordinator
 Denise McCann, American-Canadian musician, wife of Randy Bachman of Guess Who and Bachman-Turner Overdrive, born in Clinton
 James C. McGloon, Illinois state legislator
 Beth Marion, B-movie actress of the 1930s
 Peggy Moran, film actress, married film director Henry Koster
 George Nelson, former NASA astronaut
 Stephen Paddock, mass shooter, perpetrator of the 2017 Las Vegas shooting
 Allen E. Paulson, businessman, developed the Gulfstream executive jet
 Ken Ploen, football player Rose Bowl Hall of Fame, Canadian Football Hall of Fame
 Dan Roushar, American Football Coach, currently with the New Orleans Saints
 Lillian Russell, singer and actress in comic operas
 George Shadid, Illinois legislator
 Duke Slater, football player College Football Hall of Fame who became a judge
George Stone, Major League Baseball AL batting title champion
 William Theisen, founder of Godfather's Pizza
 William G. Thon, Illinois state representative and lawyer
 John Delbert Van Allen, dry goods merchant, department store owner
 Krista Voda, sportscaster, Fox Sports, SPEED Channel
 Colonel Russell W. Volckmann West Point graduate, leader of guerrilla resistance in the Philippines
 LaMetta Wynn, first African-American elected as mayor of an Iowa municipality
 W. J. Young, lumber baron, industrialist

Notable businesses, past and present
Gray & Lunt, 1857, saw mills and lumber concerns
C. Lamb (lumber), c. 1857–1868, saw mills and lumber concerns
Claussen, Thornburg & Smith, c. 1866, a small sash and door factory
Curtis, Hemingway & Co., Charles F. Curtis and W.G. Hemingway, 1866–1868, manufacturing of sash and door woodwork
Curtis Bros. & Co, George M. and Charles F. Curtis, 1866–1966, producer of doors, sashes, pre-glazed window units, blinds and general house finishings
C. Lamb & Sons, Chancy Lamb, Artemus Lamb, Lafayette Lamb, c. 1874-?, saw mills and lumber concerns
Van Allen and Company Department Store, c. 1912–1914, in the Van Allen Building
One-In-Hand Tie Company, Joseph W. Less and brothers, c. 1930s-1950s, inventors and men's clothing manufacturers
Clinton LumberKings, 1937–present, Class A minor league Midwest League team affiliated with the Miami Marlins
Clinton Herald, 1855–present, daily newspaper now owned by Community Newspaper Holdings

References

Further reading
 The Clinton Daily Herald Saturday September 5, 1891 page 6
 The Biographical Record of Clinton County Iowa S.J. Clarke Publishing Company Chicago 1901
 Wolfe's History of Clinton County Iowa B.F. Bowen & Company Indianapolis, Indiana 1911
 History of Clinton County Iowa Clinton County Historical Society 1976
 The Clinton Herald, February 5, 2007, "Why Have Odor Complaints Declined?" by Scott T. Holland.

External links

Official City Website
Chamber of Commerce
Clinton Regional Development Corporation

 
Cities in Iowa
Iowa populated places on the Mississippi River
Cities in Clinton County, Iowa
Micropolitan areas of Iowa
County seats in Iowa
1857 establishments in Iowa
Populated places established in 1857